is a train station in Date, Hokkaidō, Japan.

Lines
Hokkaido Railway Company
Muroran Main Line Station H39

Adjacent stations

Railway stations in Hokkaido Prefecture
Railway stations in Japan opened in 1928